Nima Taheri is an Iranian football defender who currently plays for Iranian football club Zob Ahan in the Persian Gulf Pro League.

References

1997 births
Living people
Iranian footballers
Zob Ahan Esfahan F.C. players
People from Isfahan Province
Association football central defenders